Ernie Vollugi (6 January 1879 – 11 May 1964) was an Australian rules footballer who played with Richmond in the Victorian Football Association (VFA) and Melbourne in the Victorian Football League (VFL).

Notes

External links 

1879 births
1964 deaths
Australian rules footballers from Victoria (Australia)
Melbourne Football Club players
Richmond Football Club (VFA) players